Line 22 may refer to:

 Line 22 (Guangzhou Metro), a metro line of the Guangzhou Metro in China
 Pinggu Line, a future subway line of the Beijing Subway in China
 Line 22 (São Paulo Metro), a future metro line of the São Paulo Metro in Brazil
 Line 22 (Shanghai Metro), a future metro line of Shanghai Metro in China